Iwalewa is a 2006 Nigerian film produced by Khabirat Kafidipe and her sister Aishat Kafidipe, directed by Tunde Olaoye. The film starred Remi Abiola and Femi Branch.

Plot summary
The film narrates the story of a young girl, Iwalewa, who lost her parents at an early age, but had to live with the agony of being an orphan.

Cast
Khabirat Kafidipe
Femi Branch
Remi Abiola

Awards and nominations
The film got three nominations, but won two awards as Best Indigenous Film and Best Original Sound Track at the 3rd Africa Movie Academy Awards held on 10 March 2007 at the Gloryland Cultural Center in Yenagoa, Bayelsa State, Nigeria.
Khbirat Kafidipe's lead role in the film earned her the Africa Movie Academy Awards of Best Actress in a Leading Role.

References

Nigerian drama films
Yoruba-language films
2006 films